Planet Pimp is the fifth studio album by pioneering jazz group Soil & "Pimp" Sessions, from Japan. It was released on May 21, 2008.

Track listing

Credits
Performed and arranged by Soil & "Pimp" Sessions
Toasting [Agitator] – Shacho
Saxophone – Motoharu
Trumpet – Tabu Zombie
Piano – Josei
Bass – Akita Goldman
Drums – Midorin
Mastered by Yasuji Maeda
Recorded and mixed By – Kiyoshi Kusaka (tracks: 1 to 9, 11 to 14), Shinjiro Ikeda (tracks: 10)
Executive Producer – Hiroyuki Makimoto (Victor)
Engineer [Assistant] – Daisuke Yamamoto, Kohei Nakaya, Ryosuke Fujii, Takafumi Kusumoto, Takahito Yamamoto, Takamitsu Kuwano, Yasufumi Sugawara
Photography – Akira Okimura (D-CORD)
Artwork by [Art Direction] – Tetsuya Nagato (www.nagato.org)
Meta Support: Bella Rienstra
Made by Meta: Janet Rienstra -Friesea

References

2008 albums
Soil & "Pimp" Sessions albums